is a national highway of Japan that connects the cities of Miyako and Morioka in Iwate Prefecture. It is paralleled for most of its length by JR East's Yamada Line.

Route description

National Route 106 is one of the primary west-east highways in Iwate Prefecture and the main route between the cities of Miyako on the Pacific coast and Morioka in the prefecture's interior plains. It carries traffic across the Kitakami Mountains that separate the two cities.

History
Work began in 1963 to upgrade the Miyako Kaidō to National Route 106 after the route was designated as Secondary National Route 106 in 1953. The secondary route designation was merged with the primary routes in 1963. The upgrades to the route were completed in 1978

After the 2011 Tōhoku earthquake and tsunami, plans were created to streamline the highway's route by a series of tunnels and bridges through the Kitakami Mountains between Miyako and Morioka. Some sections will be upgraded to expressway standards as the highway is rebuilt.

List of major junctions and features
The route lies entirely within Iwate Prefecture.

See also

References

External links

106
Roads in Iwate Prefecture